Nation of Heat is Joe Pug's debut EP. Pug recorded Nation of Heat's seven songs at a Chicago studio his friend had snuck him into when other musicians had cancelled. He self-released the EP and began shipping sampler CDs with some of its songs free of charge to whoever asked for a sample of his music. This unorthodox promotional strategy led to Pug selling 20,000 copies of Nation of Heat, piquing the attention of Lightning Rod Records, the Nashville label with which he would eventually sign. The EP was a critical success, drawing comparisons to the work of Bob Dylan and Josh Ritter. "Hymn #101," the album's opening song, drew special attention, being spotlighted on NPR's Second Stage music blog. In 2022, Pug released Nation of Heat Revisited which featured the same songs (in a different track order) but with added instrumentation.

Track listing

 "Hymn #101" – 4:40
 "Call It What You Will" – 2:56
 "Nobody's Man" – 3:36
 "Hymn #35" – 3:11
 "I Do My Father's Drugs" – 2:48
 "Speak Plainly, Diana" – 2:49
 "Nation of Heat" – 4:19

References

Joe Pug albums
2009 debut EPs